Turkish pop music artist Mustafa Sandal's discography consists of 9 studio albums, 1 compilation album, 4 EPs and 21 singles. To this day, his albums have been released by different labels including Şahin Özer Müzik, Prestij Müzik, Ascot Music, Atoll Music, Sony Music, Erol Köse Production, Universal Music, Seyhan Müzik, Poll Production and DMC. His albums have sold 13 million copies worldwide.

Albums

Studio albums

Compilation album

EPs

Singles

Appearances

References

Discographies of Turkish artists
Pop music discographies